Vincent W. Patton III (born 1954) is a retired Master Chief Petty Officer of the Coast Guard in the United States.

Education 
A 1972 graduate of Cass Technical High School, Patton was a member of the U.S. Naval Sea Cadet Corps (NSCC) division during his high school years.
Patton received his Doctor of Education degree in 1984 from the American University, Washington, DC. He has a master's degree in Counseling Psychology from Loyola University Chicago; a Bachelor of Science degree in Social Work from Shaw College at Detroit, Michigan; and a Bachelor of Arts degree in Communications from Pacific Union College, Angwin, California.

Career 
Patton became the first African American selected as the service's senior-most enlisted ranking position as the Master Chief Petty Officer of the Coast Guard in 1998. His career included staff and operational assignments both afloat and ashore throughout the United States, and a joint military service assignment in Cuba and Haiti.

Patton served as the eighth Master Chief Petty Officer of the Coast Guard from May 1998 to October 2002. As the service's top senior enlisted leader and ombudsman, he was the principal advisor to the Commandant of the Coast Guard, his directorates, and the Secretaries of Transportation and Defense.

References

External links
Pinnacle Five
Vince Patton Blog

Living people
1954 births
Military personnel from Detroit
Master Chief Petty Officers of the Coast Guard
Recipients of the Coast Guard Distinguished Service Medal
American Security Council Foundation
American University alumni
Loyola University Chicago alumni
Pacific Union College alumni